Yoav (Poli) Mordechai (born March 25, 1964, in Jerusalem) is a retired major general in the Israel Defense Forces. He concluded his 36-year career in the IDF in 2018 as the Coordinator of Government Activities in the Territories.

Mordechai was recruited to the IDF in 1982 and served as a soldier and an officer in the 51st Battalion of the Golani Brigade. Then he served in the Research Department in the Intelligence Directorate, and in an operational unit in the branch. In 2001 he was appointed to be chief of coordination and connection headquarters in Gaza, and later served as chief of civilian administration in the West Bank in the staff of the Government's Actions Coordinator in the Territories.

From April 7, 2011, to October 14, 2013, Mordechai served as the IDF Spokesperson. On January 29, 2014, following his promotion to the rank of major general, Mordechai was appointed as the Coordinator of Government Activities in the Territories.

Mordechai speaks fluent Arabic. He has a master's degree of government and politics and additional master's degree in National Security studies in the frame of the National Security College.

Mordechai is married and a father to three daughters.

References

External links
 
 

1964 births
Israel Defense Forces spokespersons
Israeli generals
Living people
People from Jerusalem